Orlando Quintana García (born 25 March 1978 in Las Palmas, Canary Islands) is a Spanish retired footballer who played as a goalkeeper.

External links

Celta de Vigo biography 

1978 births
Living people
Footballers from Las Palmas
Spanish footballers
Association football goalkeepers
La Liga players
Segunda División players
Segunda División B players
Tercera División players
UD Las Palmas Atlético players
UD Las Palmas players
Universidad de Las Palmas CF footballers
RC Celta de Vigo players
Lorca Deportiva CF footballers
Mérida UD footballers
Pontevedra CF footballers
SD Ponferradina players
Real Oviedo players